The British 13th Destroyer Flotilla, or Thirteenth Destroyer Flotilla, was a naval formation of the Royal Navy from November 1915 – November 1918 and again from September 1939 to January 1944.

History

World War One
The flotilla was first formed in November 1915 and was assigned to the Grand Fleet.  Between 31 May and 1 June 1916 it was present at the Battle of Jutland as part of the Battle Cruiser Fleet. It remained with the Grand Fleet until November 1918 and was disbanded in March 1919.

Second World War
In September 1939 the flotilla was re-established and assigned to the North Atlantic Command at Gibraltar. On 29 January 1943 it was operating within the command as part of the Gibraltar Escort Force until 2 July 1943. The flotilla remained in the North Atlantic Command until May 1945 when it was disbanded.

Operational deployments

Administration

Captains (D) afloat 13th Destroyer Flotilla
Incomplete list of post holders included:

References

Sources
 Bertke, Donald A.; Smith, Gordon; Kindell, Don (2011). WORLD WAR TWO SEA WAR. Morrisville, NC, USA: Lulu. .
 Harley, Simon; Lovell, Tony. (2018) "Thirteenth Destroyer Flotilla (Royal Navy) - The Dreadnought Project". www.dreadnoughtproject.org. Harley and Lovell, 29 May 2018. Retrieved 9 July 2018.
 Hewitt, Geoff (2008). Hitler's Armada: The German Invasion Plan, and the Defence of Great Britain by the Royal Navy, April–October 1940. Barnsley, England: Pen & Sword Maritime. .
 Watson, Dr Graham. (2015) Royal Navy Organisation and Ship Deployments 1900-1914". www.naval-history.net. G. Smith. 
 Watson, Dr Graham. (2015) "Royal Navy Organisation and Ship Deployment, Inter-War Years 1919-1938". www.naval-history.net. Gordon Smith.
 Watson, Dr Graham. (2015) "Royal Navy Organisation in World War 2, 1939-1945". www.naval-history.net. Gordon Smith.

Destroyer flotillas of the Royal Navy
Military units and formations established in 1915
Military units and formations disestablished in 1919
Military units and formations established in 1939
Military units and formations disestablished in 1945